William Sharp Bush (1786 - 1812) was an officer in the United States Marine Corps during the War of 1812. He was also the first Marine Corps officer to be killed in combat.

Born in Wilmington, Delaware, Bush was appointed as a Second Lieutenant in the Marine Corps on 3 July 1809 and was promoted to First Lieutenant on 4 March 1811. He lost his life while serving aboard , when he fell mortally wounded while attempting to board the frigate  on 19 August 1812.

He was posthumously awarded a silver medal by the United States Congress. His silver medal was presented to his nearest male relative, Lewis Bush Jackson, in early 1835.

Namesake
Two destroyers in the U.S. Navy have been named after Bush. The first  was a  that served from 1919 to 1922 and was scrapped in 1936. The second  was a  that served during World War II from 1943 to 1945. She was sunk in April 1945 off of Okinawa after being struck by three Japanese kamikaze aircraft during the naval invasion of Okinawa.

References

1786 births
1812 deaths
American military personnel killed in the War of 1812
United States Marine Corps officers
People from Wilmington, Delaware